Sri Krishna Nagar is an important commercial & residential area in the west zone of Hyderabad, India. It is adjacent to Jubilee Hills Rd #2 and is well connected to all parts of the city.

This is now a bustling suburb, especially for people working in the Telugu film industry, and also to software professionals. Many cine artists live here. Annapurna studios, a famous landmark, is located nearer to the Krishna Nagar.  Also, KBR park, LV Prasad Hospital are just a stone's throw away from Sri Krishna Nagar.

Commercial area
There are many super markets and multispeciality hospitals located in this suburb.

Transport
The buses run by TSRTC connect Krishna nagar to all parts of the city. Bus numbers 9c,9y etc. run through this neighbourhood. There is also a mini-bus service called as Setwin service.

The closest MMTS Train station is at Begumpet.

Neighbourhoods in Hyderabad, India